CJHL may refer to:

Ice hockey leagues in Canada
Canadian Junior Hockey League, the association of Canadian Junior "A" hockey leagues
Calgary Junior Hockey League, in Calgary, Alberta
Calgary Junior C Hockey League, in Calgary, Alberta
Capital Junior Hockey League, in Edmonton, Alberta area
Central Junior A Hockey League, in Eastern Ontario
Central Junior C Hockey League, in Eastern Ontario

Former ice hockey leagues
Ontario Provincial Junior A Hockey League, formerly Central Junior B Hockey League 1971–1993
Georgian Mid-Ontario Junior C Hockey League, formerly Central Junior C Hockey League 1973–1976
Western Junior C Hockey League, formerly Central Junior C Hockey League 1969 until the 1980s

See also
Central/West Junior Hockey League (CWJHL), in Newfoundland